Saunders Hall may refer to:
Goode-Hall House, a plantation house on the U.S. National Register of Historic Places
Saunders Hall (Chapel Hill, North Carolina), now Carolina Hall, a structure on the campus of the University of North Carolina at Chapel Hill
 Saunders Hall (Charlottesville, Virginia), the main building of the University of Virginia Darden School of Business

Architectural disambiguation pages